Tamman is a village and Union Council of Tehsil & District Talagang of Punjab Province, Pakistan.

References

Union councils of Chakwal District
Populated places in Chakwal District